Turbo cornutus, common name the horned turban, is a species of sea snail, marine gastropod mollusk in the family Turbinidae.

Description
It has a large, thick, green-gray shell with irregular incremental striae and spiral lirae. The shell has about 5-6 whorls, which turn clockwise and have horny protuberances. The body whorl is ventricose, somewhat bicarinate, armed about the middle with two spiral series of erect tubular spines, and frequently a smaller accessory row above. The lower series of spines is sometimes absent. The thickness and shape of the shell and the horns vary greatly according to environmental conditions. The sutures are deeply impressed. The thin inside lip of the shell is not smooth, but rough and granular. The broad columella is flattened and somewhat grooved, produced and channelled at its base.

Turbo cornutus develops an operculum, which is calcareous, concave and brown within. It contains four whorls. The nucleus measures one-third the distance across the face. The operculum itself bears a deep, spiral groove and is also granular on the convex outer surface. This outer surface is white or tinged with brown and olive, more or less sharply asperate with elevated points, and with a spiral rib commencing in an axial elevation and terminating at the margin of increment. When separated from the attached animal, the inner side of the operculum is flat, with a somewhat smooth spiral.

Due to an anatomical quirk of growth of gastropods, the anus is located on its head. As marine snails, they breathe through gills.

Distribution
This marine species occurs off the Mascarene Basin, the Philippines, Jeju Island, and China.

According to Fukuda 2017, Turbo cornutus should be restricted to the species endemic to southern China and Taiwan.
The species in Japan is Turbo sazae.

Habitat and reproduction
Turbo cornutus can be found in relatively shallow coastal waters (up to 30 meters deep). It can be found around China. It feeds on various kinds of algae. Young horned turban shells eat red-turf algae, while adults eat larger seaweed.

Turbo cornutus spawns from August to September, although the gonads begin to mature from May. Larvae have a very short period as free-floating plankton at approximately five days, after which they settle and begin to develop a shell. The planktonic and early shell-growing stages are highly dangerous times for young horned turban shells, and they are eaten in large numbers.

References

 Alf A. & Kreipl K. (2003). A Conchological Iconography: The Family Turbinidae, Subfamily Turbininae, Genus Turbo. Conchbooks, Hackenheim Germany.
 
 Alf A. & Kreipl K. (2011) The family Turbinidae. Subfamily Turbinidae, Genus Turbo. Errata, corrections and new information on the genera Lunella, Modelia and Turbo (vol. I). In: G.T. Poppe & K. Groh (eds), A Conchological Iconography. Hackenheim: Conchbooks. pp. 69–72, pls 96-103. 
 Hooper, R (2007). "Horned turban shell". The Japan Times. Retrieved on 2010-07-06.

External links

 Japan Times Article: "Horned turban shell"

See also
 Turbo sazae

cornutus
Gastropods described in 1786
Marine gastropods